The Seduction of Almighty God by the Boy Priest Loftus in the Abbey of Calcetto, 1539 is a play by British playwright Howard Barker. It premiered at Riverside Studios in London in 2006, in a production directed by French theatre director Guillaume Dujardin.

Synopsis
The play is set during the dissolution of the English monasteries. Its themes are loss of faith and corruption among the priesthood at the time. The arrival at the monastery mentioned in the play's title of a young novice with an unsullied belief in God challenges prevailing practices by the abbey's priests.

Critical reception
Reviewer Duska Radosavljevic wrote in trade paper The Stage that 'the production’s strength rests on a Barkerian juxtaposition of the intellectual and the visceral within a bleached out, ascetic and abstracted frame.'

References

British plays
2006 plays